The Inland Steel Building is a skyscraper located at 30 W. Monroe Street in Chicago, Illinois. It is one of the city's defining commercial high-rises of the post-World War II era of modern architecture. Its principal designers were Bruce Graham and Walter Netsch of the Skidmore, Owings & Merrill architecture firm. The building is managed and leased by MB Real Estate. The Inland Steel Building was designated a Chicago Landmark in 1998.

Architecture

The use of brushed stainless steel cladding reflects the corporation that commissioned the building as its headquarters, the Inland Steel Company.

The placement of all structural columns on the building's perimeter—and the consolidation of elevators and other service functions in a separate tower—allowed for a highly flexible interior floor layout with no interior columns. This design is a good example of the widely held principle of the era, "form follows function" (Louis Sullivan). The lobby features a sculpture of gold, stainless steel and enameled copper by Richard Lippold entitled Radiant I.

The Inland Steel Building was designated a Chicago Landmark on October 7, 1998.

The building would later serve as the prototype for SOM’s much larger One Chase Manhattan Plaza in New York City, completed in 1961. Key architectural and structural concepts incorporated in the building influenced those used in the design and construction
of the Cooperative Insurance Tower in Manchester, United Kingdom (completed 1962).

References

External links

Inland Steel Building - Skidmore, Owings & Merrill
Inland Steel Building Renovation - Skidmore, Owings & Merrill

Office buildings completed in 1957
Skyscraper office buildings in Chicago
Skidmore, Owings & Merrill buildings
Commercial buildings on the National Register of Historic Places in Chicago
Chicago Landmarks
1957 establishments in Illinois